Best Baker in America is an American cooking competition television series that airs on Food Network.

The first season of the series officially premiered on September 27, 2017; and it was presented by Bon Appétit magazine editor Adam Rapoport, who also served as a judge alongside Food Network chefs Jason Smith and Marcela Valladolid. The second season of the series premiered on May 7, 2018; with Rapoport having been replaced as host by chef Scott Conant, along with a rotating lineup of special guest chefs who would serve as the third judge. The third season premiered on May 13, 2019. Season 4 premiered on May 3, 2021.

Season 1
There are 8 professional and home bakers competing in a 6-episode baking tournament. One person is eliminated every week until the final episode where the final three compete for the grand prize of $25,000.

Contestants

1st - Dwayne Ingraham, Executive Pastry Chef from Oxford, MS

2nd/3rd - Andy Chlebana, Pastry Instructor from Plainfield, IL

2nd/3rd - Thiago Silva, Executive Pastry Chef from Boston, MA

4th - Adalberto Diaz Labrada, Pastry Chef and Instructor from Salt Lake City, UT

5th - Cheryl Storms, Bakery Owner from San Diego, CA

6th - Brittani Brooker, Executive Pastry Chef from Charlotte, NC

7th - Susana Mijares, Bakery Owner from San Antonio, TX

8th - Margarita Kallas-Lee, Pastry Chef from Los Angeles, CA

Episodes

Elimination Table

 (WINNER) This baker won the competition.
 (RUNNER-UP) This baker was a finalist.
 (ELIM) This baker was eliminated.
 (IN) This baker never had the best dish or the worst.
 (HIGH) This baker had one of the best dishes.
 (WIN) This baker had the best dish.
‡ This baker had the best dish in the skills challenge.
 (LOW) This baker was last to be called safe.

Season 2
There are 9 contestants competing in a 7-episode baking tournament. One person is eliminated every week until the final episode where the final three compete for the grand prize of $25,000.

Contestants

1st - Adam Young, Bakery Owner and Head Pastry Chef from Mystic, CT

2nd/3rd - Jean-Francois Suteau, Executive Pastry Chef from White Sulphur Springs, WV

2nd/3rd - Lasheeda Perry, Executive Pastry Chef from Atlanta, GA

4th - Max Santiago, Executive Pastry Chef from Miami, FL

5th - Becca Craig, Executive Cake Chef from Philadelphia, PA

6th - Leigh Omilinsky, Pastry Chef from Chicago, IL

7th - Jeremy Fogg, Pastry Chef from New Orleans, LA

8th - Kym DeLost, Pastry Chef from Chicago, IL

9th - Frania Mendivil, Executive Pastry Chef from Los Angeles, CA

Episodes

Elimination Table

 (WINNER) This baker won the competition.
 (RUNNER-UP) This baker was a finalist.
 (ELIM) This baker was eliminated.
 (IN) This baker never had the best dish or the worst.
 (HIGH) This baker had one of the best dishes.
 (WIN) This baker had the best dish.
‡ This baker had the best dish in the skills challenge.
 (LOW) This baker was last to be called safe.

Season 3
There are 9 contestants competing in a 7-episode baking tournament. One person is eliminated every week until the final episode where the final three compete for the grand prize of $25,000.

Contestants

1st - Eric Keppler, Executive Pastry Chef from East Palo Alto, CA

2nd/3rd - Jeffrey De Leon, Pastry Chef Consultant from White Los Angeles, CA

2nd/3rd - Joshua Livsey, Executive Pastry Chef from Boston, MA

4th - Marian Mulero, Pastry Chef from Miami, FL

5th - Julie Franceschini, Executive Pastry Chef from West Palm Beach, FL

6th - Michael Russ II, Executive Pastry Chef from Oakland, CA

7th - Edet Okon, Freelance Cake Artist and Owner from Houston, TX

8th - Yolanda Diaz, Executive Pastry Chef from Austin, TX

9th - Casey Renee, Pastry Chef from Pittsburgh, PA

Episodes

Elimination Table

 (WINNER) This baker won the competition.
 (RUNNER-UP) This baker was a finalist.
 (ELIM) This baker was eliminated.
 (IN) This baker never had the best dish or the worst.
 (HIGH) This baker had one of the best dishes.
 (WIN) This baker had the best dish.
‡ This baker had the best dish in the skills challenge.
 (LOW) This baker was last to be called safe.

Season 4

References

External links
 
 
 Welcome to Levity Live

2010s American cooking television series
2010s American reality television series
2017 American television series debuts
English-language television shows
Food Network original programming
Food reality television series
Television series by Levity Live
Cooking competitions in the United States